This is a list of diplomatic missions of Senegal, excluding honorary consulates. Senegal is a French-speaking country located in West Africa.

Africa

 Algiers (Embassy)

 Ouagadougou (Embassy)

 Yaoundé (Embassy)

 Praia (Embassy)

 Brazzaville (Embassy)
 Pointe-Noire (Consulate-General)

 Cairo (Embassy)

 Addis Ababa (Embassy)

 Libreville (Embassy)

 Banjul (Embassy)

 Accra (Embassy)

 Conakry (Embassy)

 Bissau (Embassy)

 Abidjan (Embassy)

 Nairobi (Embassy)

 Tripoli (Embassy)

 Bamako (Embassy)

 Nouakchott (Embassy)

 Rabat (Embassy)
 Casablanca (Consulate)
 Dakhla (Consulate-General)

 Abuja (Embassy)
 Lagos (Consulate-General)

 Kigali (Embassy)

 Pretoria (Embassy)

 Lomé (Embassy)

 Tunis (Embassy)

 Lusaka (Consulate-General)

Americas

 Brasília (Embassy)

 Ottawa (Embassy)

 Washington, D.C. (Embassy)
 New York (Consulate-General)

Asia

 Manama (Embassy)

 Beijing (Embassy)

 New Delhi (Embassy)

 Tehran (Embassy)

 Tokyo (Embassy)

 Kuwait City (Embassy)

 Kuala Lumpur (Embassy)

 Muscat (Embassy)

 Doha (Embassy)

 Riyadh (Embassy)
 Jeddah (Consulate-General)

 Seoul  (Embassy)

 Ankara (Embassy)

 Abu Dhabi (Embassy)

Europe

 Brussels (Embassy)

 Paris (Embassy)
 Bordeaux (Consulate-General)
 Lyon (Consulate-General)
 Marseille (Consulate-General)
 Le Havre (Consular Agency)

 Berlin (Embassy)

 Rome (Embassy)

 Rome (Embassy)
 Milan (Consulate-General)

 The Hague (Embassy)

 Warsaw (Embassy)

 Lisbon (Embassy)

 Moscow (Embassy)

 Madrid (Embassy)

 Geneva (Embassy)

 London (Embassy)

Embassy to open

Jerusalem (Embassy)

Multilateral organizations
 African Union
Addis Ababa (Permanent Mission to the African Union)

Brussels (Mission to the European Union)

Geneva (Permanent Mission to the United Nations and international organizations)
New York (Permanent Mission to the United Nations)

Paris (Permanent Mission to UNESCO)

Gallery

See also
 Foreign relations of Senegal

Notes

References
Ministry of Foreign Affairs of Senegal (French)

Senegal
 
Diplomatic missions